Brienne may refer to:

Places
Brienne, Saône-et-Loire, a commune in the Saône-et-Loire department in eastern France
Brienne-la-Vieille, a commune in the Aube department in north-central France
Brienne-le-Château, a commune in the Aube department in north-central France
Canton of Brienne-le-Château, a modern administrative division based on Brienne-le-Château
County of Brienne, a medieval fiefdom based on Brienne-le-Château
Brienne-sur-Aisne, a commune in the Ardennes department in northern France

People with the name

Given name
Brienne Minor (born 1997), an American tennis player
Brienne Pedigo, an American auto racing pit reporter
Brienne Stairs (born 1989), a Canadian women's field hockey player

Surname

Louis de Brienne de Conflans d'Armentières (1711–1774), a French general
Étienne Charles de Loménie de Brienne (1727–1794), a French clergyman and statesman

Fiction
Brienne of Tarth, a fictional character in George R. R. Martin's A Song of Ice and Fire series of fantasy novels